The Fyfe Hills are a group of low coastal hills in Antarctica, lying south of Dingle Dome and immediately east of the Hydrographer Islands. They were sighted in October 1957 by an Australian National Antarctic Research Expeditions party led by B.H. Stinear, and were named by the Antarctic Names Committee of Australia for W.V. Fyfe, Surveyor General of Western Australia.

References

Hills of Antarctica
Landforms of Enderby Land